Jean-Paul Vincent  is a developmental biologist working at the Francis Crick Institute.

Research 
Vincent has conducted work on the Wnt signalling pathways that help to regulate cell-to-cell interactions.

His work on cell signalling and behaviour has led to an improved understanding of diseases such as cancer in which fundamental biological processes are altered. Earlier in his career, he pioneered the use of caged dye technology to trace the cellular development of fruit fly embryos, and established a relationship between the alignment of frog embryos and their so-called subcortical rotation in the egg.

Awards and honours 
Vincent was elected a Fellow of the Royal Society (FRS) in 2013. His certificate of election reads:

He is a Fellow of the Academy of Medical Sciences.

References 

Developmental biologists
Living people
Fellows of the Royal Society
Fellows of the Academy of Medical Sciences (United Kingdom)
Year of birth missing (living people)
Academics of the Francis Crick Institute